Donald MacKintosh or Mackintosh may refer to:

 Donald MacKintosh (VC) (1896–1917), Scottish recipient of the Victoria Cross
 Donald Mackintosh (bishop) (1876–1943), Roman Catholic Archbishop of Glasgow
 Donald Mackintosh (politician) (1840–1932), farmer and member of the Queensland Legislative Assembly
 Donald Mackintosh (shooter) (1866–1951), Australian sports shooter
 Donald James MacKintosh (1862–1947), Scottish physician, soldier and public health expert